Ernst-Thälmann-Park is a park in the centre of the Prenzlauer Berg district in Berlin. It was laid out in 1986 at the site of a former coal gas plant and named after the former Communist party leader Ernst Thälmann (1886-1944).

The former plant built in 1874 was closed in 1981, the last gasometer was demolished in 1984. In honor of Berlin's 750-year jubilee the East German government drew up plans for an "inhabited park", including a memorial, a public pool, a planetarium, a school and a housing estate for 4,000 residents. The park was inaugurated on 16 April 1986, Thälmann's hundredth birthday. The former use of the area left an extensive contamination of soil and groundwater with cyanides, phenols and tar that after German reunification had to be cleared by excavation and bioremediation. Though there had been some discussion about the name, a majority of dwellers voted against a change in 1997. Today the park features public houses as well as art galleries and a small theatre at the former administrative building of the gas plant.

Some plaques with political slogans were removed in the 1990s. The monument remains a protected landmark today.

Since the early 2000s the Ernst Thälmann bronze monument has become a famous skateboarding spot with professionals from all over the world visiting the site. Memorable skateboarders such as Dylan Rieder and Kenny Hopf have performed their outrageous trickery at the venue. Hopf even filmed a full video part at the historical site during COVID-19-lockdown in 2020.

References

External links
 

Parks in Berlin
Pankow